The  Washington Redskins season was the franchise's 47th season in the National Football League (NFL) and their 42nd in Washington, D.C. The team failed to improve on their 9–5 record from 1977, finishing 8-8.  

This was the first of Jack Pardee's three seasons as head coach of the Redskins. This was also the first season in which the NFL expanded from a 14-game season to a 16-game schedule. The Redskins started the season 6-0 and got to 8-3, but ended the season with a five-game losing streak and missed the playoffs. The losing streak began with a loss to a Cardinals team which had started 0-8. The Cardinals would not win again at RFK Stadium until 1993, their sixth season in Arizona.

Quarterback and longtime Redskins favorite Billy Kilmer, who primarily served as backup to Joe Theismann during this season, would retire when it was over.

Offseason

NFL Draft

Roster

Regular season

Schedule

Week 2
TV Network: CBS
Announcers: Lindsey Nelson, Paul Hornung, Roman Gabriel
It was an exciting contest, and the fireworks began early as the Eagles' Wilbert Montgomery opened the scoring with a great 34-yard touchdown run in the first period, but back came the Redskins as Joe Theismann who was to have another good game scores from the 4 to even the game. But the Eagles came back as a field goal by Nick Mike-Mayer from 32, but then it was the Redskins offensive show as the Redskins scored 21 unanswered points to take a commanding 28-10 lead. For the day Theismann passed for 226 yards and 3 touchdown passes. Then both teams traded touchdowns to make it a 35-16, the last one was a flea flicker touchdown pass from 37 yards from Joe Theismann to Jean Fugett. But back came the Eagles who in the 3rd year of the Dick Vermeil era became a competitive team. Just after the Skins scored the Eagles came back as Montgomery first scored from 8 yards and then on the next possession scored from 5 yards. The Eagles also drove deep as Montgomery scored form 5 yards but was brought back due to a holding penalty and on the next play Mike Curtis intercept a Ron Jaworski pass ending the drive and with it the Redskins come away with a win and sole possession of first place in the NFC East.

Week 5

Standings

References

Washington
Washington Redskins seasons
Washing